After Dark is a compilation album of tracks either performed by artists on the Italians Do It Better record label or remixed by the label, released in 2007 on CD and in 2008 on triple vinyl. Artists featured on the album are Glass Candy, Chromatics, Indeep, Farah, Mirage, and Professor Genius.

In October 2012, Johnny Jewel released a remastered version of the album for free on Soundcloud to build anticipation for After Dark 2. Jewel announced that After Dark 2 would be released on May 17, 2013.

Track listing

References

2007 compilation albums
Record label compilation albums